Courtenay Place is the main street of the Courtenay Quarter in the Wellington inner-city district of Te Aro.

Courtenay Place is known for its entertainment and nightlife. Many restaurants are open late and most of the bars stay open until dawn. It contains offices, accommodation, tourist shopping, entertainment, food, art and buskers offering many genres of free performance. Pedestrian traffic is substantial around the clock.

The arts

Every two years Courtenay Place is home to many of the New Zealand International Arts Festival events.

Bats Theatre is a venue for the development of new theatre practitioners and plays.

Downstage Theatre, founded in 1964, was New Zealand's first professional theatre. It closed in 2013.

Embassy Theatre The Lord of the Rings movie The Return of the King had its world premiere at the Embassy Theatre at the head of Courtenay Place. The movies The Two Towers and The Fellowship of the Ring both had their Australasian premiere at the Embassy (Event Slide Shows). Both events were broadcast live to the world for many hours, involving the movement of record amounts of data by CityLink. The theatre is on the Wellington City Council's heritage list in the District Plan. Heritage New Zealand has recognised its heritage values with Category One registration, indicating a place of 'special or outstanding historical or cultural heritage significance or value'. It was originally known as the 'De Luxe' and was built in 1924. Designed by Llewellyn Williams and constructed of reinforced concrete, it included classical external and internal architectural details. The name changed to the Embassy in 1945. A long list of theatre identities has been associated with the theatre, including William Kemball, who formed the De Luxe Theatre Company in 1923, and Sir Robert Kerridge. Kerry Robins, leaseholder of the Paramount Theatre in Wellington, took over the lease of the Embassy in 1996. It was purchased by the Embassy Theatre Trust in 1997 with financial underwriting of the refurbishment programme by Wellington City Council. Ownership was transferred to the WCC under the terms of the agreement. Embassy Theatre Trust subsidiary Company Financial report: Audit report In October 2005 Wellington film exhibitor Kerry Robins sold the operational management of the Embassy to Village SkyCity Cinemas.

Paramount Theatre (no longer operational) was until 2017 the oldest surviving cinema in Wellington, still with its original name. Originally a part of Te Aro beach, in August 1916 the location of the Paramount was purchased by John James Williamson. He arranged for architect James Bennie to design a picture house. The cinema closed down in 2017, following its sale to developers.

Reading Courtenay Central Complex contains shops, restaurants and a ten-screen multiplex cinema. The 8,000 m² development links Courtenay Place with the waterfront and was designed to complement the existing character of the strip. This project won the 2003 Property Council NZ Entertainment Excellence Award. The site was originally bulldozed in the mid-1980s by Chase Corporation for the proposed Wakefield Centre, but after the company fell victim to the 1987 sharemarket crash, the site remained derelict for years until it was purchased by Reading Cinemas. The complex was temporarily shut down for safety reasons, after the 2016 Kaikoura earthquake damaged an adjacent parking building beyond repair. After reopening following the demolition of the parking building, the cinema section shut down again in 2019 due to further unseen structural issues.

Ngā Taonga Sound & Vision (aka NZ Film Archive) was located on the corner of Ghuznee St and Taranaki St, a block from Courtenay Place. In 2019 it announced its relocation to the National Library of New Zealand on Molesworth St, due to earthquake concerns.

St James Theatre. Formerly His Majesty's (and more recently the Westpac St James Theatre), the St. James was designed for John Fuller and Sons Ltd by Mr Henry Eli White Architect, structural engineer and contractor. It was the first steel-framed concrete-coated proscenium-arched theatre in the Southern Hemisphere. The steel frame allowed for an unsupported 80 ft (25 m) span roof structure and also provided good resistance to earthquake damage.

In July 2011, Positively Wellington Venues, an integration between the Wellington Convention Centre and the St James Theatre Trust, began managing this theatre as well as The Opera House, Wellington.

There are two other theatres that sit just outside the Courtenay Place district, Circa Theatre which sits on the waterfront near Te Papa; and Capital E, home of the National Theatre for Children, which is in Civic Square. The Opera House is in Manners Street.

Events
In 2017, TEDxWellington hosted 13 speakers and 1,000 delegates at the St. James Theatre on Courtenay Place.

Gallery

Railway station

Courtenay Place's own railway station sat between Tory, Blair and Allen Streets bringing produce from the hinterland to the markets there and the milk to be processed before distribution from upper Tory Street. 

Rail's passenger traffic took to the trams when they were electrified in 1904 and the station closed during the first world war. The rails were torn up soon after.

Early development 

The north-eastern side of Courtenay Place was beach until the 1855 earthquake when it became swamp drained by the stream from the Basin Reserve between Kent and Cambridge Terraces. The short-lived Te Aro Pa was at the higher end west of Taranaki Street and a remnant of a structure can be seen in situ at 39–43 Taranaki Street. By 1870 the Pa site which once covered as much as 80 acres had been sold and subdivided. The triangle at that end was designated a Market Reserve. The inland Taranaki Street corner became Rouse Black and Hurrell’s carriage manufactory in 1859 (Hope Gibbons Ford lineal descendant) and the beachfront corner became Greenfield’s timber mill (Reading Cinemas) in 1862. The Wellington Gas Company put up its coal to gas and coke plant and gasometers on 3½ acres of reclaimed land in 1871 and their head office building beside it on the corner of Tory Street and Courtenay Place in 1898. The Gas Company building is currently labelled KFC.

It is reported that "the first building of any importance in Courtenay Place was built shortly after 1900 by local butcher and businessman, John Rod JP". It is now a heritage listed building, originally designed by T S Lambert, situated on the eastern corner of Allen Street and Courtenay Place. Of brick construction, it originally had three stories and a large cellar, with stables at the rear (now 23 Allen street). It has since been reduced to two stories, probably due to earthquake damage. In 2015, the ground floor and cellars accommodate a bar and restaurant.

References

External links

 Courtenay Place 3D visitor guide

Streets in Wellington City
Entertainment districts
Arts districts
Restaurant districts and streets
Shopping districts and streets in New Zealand